Mwamba is a name of Zambian origin. Notable people with the name include:
Mwamba Luchembe (born 1960), Zambian politician  
Alexis Thambwe Mwamba (born 1943), Congolese politician
Anthony Mwamba (1960–2021), Zambian boxer
Bertin Mwamba (born 1932), Congolese politician
Christopher Mwamba, Zambian boxer 
Emmanuel Mwamba (born 1971), Zambian diplomat
Félix Mwamba Musasa (born 1976), Congolese football player
Geoffrey Bwalya Mwamba (born 1959), Zambian businessman and politician 
Godfrey Mwamba (born 1950), Zambian boxer
Kazadi Mwamba (1947–1998), Zambian goalkeeper
Kongolo Mwamba, first king of the Luba Empire
Martin Mwamba (born 1964), Zambian footballer
Meji Mwamba (born 1959), Democratic Republic of the Congo boxer
Mmasekgoa Masire-Mwamba, Botswana women politician
Patrick Mwamba (born 1964), Zambian boxer
Rémy Mwamba (1921–1967), Congolese politician
Trevor Mwamba (born 1958), Anglican bishop of Botswana

See also
Muamba (disambiguation), includes a list of people with the name Muamba

Bemba-language surnames
Bemba-language given names
Zambian given names
Zambian surnames
Given names of the Democratic Republic of the Congo
Surnames of the Democratic Republic of the Congo